Orcopampa Airport  is an extremely high elevation airport serving the town of Orcopampa (es) and the Minas Buenaventura open pit mine in the Arequipa Region of Peru.

See also

Transport in Peru
List of airports in Peru

References

External links
OpenStreetMap - Orcopampa
OurAirports - Orcopampa
SkyVector - Orcopampa
Orcopampa Airport

Airports in Peru
Buildings and structures in Arequipa Region